Carlos Andres Torres Rivera  (born 20 September 1988 in Barranquilla, Colombia) is a Colombian actor. The beginning of his debut on television in the Colombian drama series Padres e Hijos. His most notable roles in television have been in telenovelas such as Francisco el matemático: Clase 2017, The Queen of Flow, and All For Love.

Career 
Torres debuted on Colombian television in 2005 at age 17 in the long-running series, Padres e hijos. Subsequently, he played Franco Fritzenwalden in the Colombian version of the Argentine series, Floricienta. Before getting his first role as a main character in a telenovela, he participated as a recurring character in other telenovela like Pocholo, and Cómplices.

In 2009 he got his first role as the main character in the telenovela, Amor mentiras y video. Between 2010 and 2012, he played the main villain of the series Niñas mal, a version of the Mexican film of the same name. In 2012 he obtained one of the main roles as a young protagonist in the telenovela, Pobres rico. In that same year he participated in Las Santísimas, a telenovela that was kept for five years, and which premiered in other countries first, although in Colombia it was broadcast between 2015 and 2016.

In 2013 he got a recurring role in the telenovela, Secretos del paraíso, a modern adaptation of La maldición del paraíso, whose premiere was first in Latin America, and the following year in Colombia.

In 2018 he emerged as a star in the whole Latin America because of his role in The Queen of Flow.

Personal life
His mother Carmen Rivera is an architect. He has an elder brother, Enrique, whose birthday is also the 20th of September.

His long-time girlfriend Joanna Castro is an entrepreneur involved in the health food brand Viva Natur.

Filmography

References

External links 
 

1988 births
Living people
21st-century Colombian male actors
Colombian male television actors
Colombian male telenovela actors
People from Barranquilla